The Curtis Publishing Company, founded in 1891 in Philadelphia, Pennsylvania, became one of the largest and most influential publishers in the United States during the early 20th century. The company's publications included the Ladies' Home Journal and The Saturday Evening Post, The American Home, Holiday, Jack & Jill, and Country Gentleman. In the 1940s, Curtis also had a comic book imprint, Novelty Press.  The company declined in the later 20th century, and its publications were sold or discontinued.  It now exists as Curtis Licensing, which licenses images of and from Curtis magazine covers and artwork.

History

The Curtis Publishing Company was founded in 1891 by publisher Cyrus H. K. Curtis, who published the People's Ledger, a news magazine he had begun in Boston in 1872 and moved to Philadelphia in 1876.  The city was already a major publishing center. Curtis also established the Tribune and Farmer in 1879. From a brief women's supplement, his wife, Louisa Knapp Curtis, developed a women's section and the Ladies' Home Journal, which she edited from 1883 to 1889. 

Curtis made these publications part of his new company. Curtis bought the Saturday Evening Post for $1000 in 1897 and developed it as one of the nation's most popular periodicals. The magazine had its roots in Ben Franklin's Pennsylvania Gazette and went as far back as 1728. When Curtis took over the Post it had a subscription base of 2,000. The base was over 1 million by 1906 and by 1960 was over six million. Editor George Horace Lorimer brought in top writers and illustrators and helped usher in "American's Golden Age of Illustration." Artists such as Norman Rockwell were featured as well as J. C. Leyendecker, John Clymer, Stevan Dohanos, Sarah Stilwell-Weber, and John La Gatta. 

Curtis Publishing created a market research division in 1911 under Charles Coolidge Parlin. The goal of the division was to understand their customers and was one of the first market research firms. 

Curtis reported record earnings of $21 million on $84 million in revenue in 1929.

Curtis spun off their market research division, National Analysts, as an independent organization to provide market research services to business and government.

In 1946, Curtis Publishing launched Holiday magazine, focusing on travel and photo essays.

1960s and decline of Curtis Publishing 
The advent of television in the late 1940s and early 1950s competed for people's attention and eroded the popularity of general-interest periodicals such as the Post and the Journal. The New York Times reported that both the finance markets and Madison Avenue were watching Curtis Publishing's efforts to save itself after a financial decline. The reason the New York Times gave for the attention, "the status of the venerable Curtis empire, the colorful cast of characters directing the comeback attempt, the vast sums of money at stake. In addition, Curtis's troubles seemed to reflect the difficulties encountered by the mass magazines industry as a whole in adjusting to an era dominated by the spiraling growth of television." It wasn't until 1961 and 1962 that the struggle became evident in lost revenue. In 1961 Curtis Publishing president Robert A. MacNeal announced that the company had lost money for the first time in the more than seven decades since its incorporation. The company's financials showed a loss of $4,194,000 on $178.4 million in revenue that year. The next year in 1962, company had total revenues of $149 million and a loss of $18.9 million. Curtis management went to Serge Semenenko who had helped the Hearst Corporation to reorganize and Semenenko arranged for a six-bank syndicate to loan $10.5 million to Curtis.  

Many experts wrote of multiple issues tied to the decline of Curtis. Many of their competitors such as Time, Inc. and McCall Corporation had diversified while Curtis remained focused on their two key periodicals--Saturday Evening Post and Ladies' Home Journal. Their other magazines -- Holiday, Jack & Jill, and American -- simply could not make up the lost revenue of the main periodicals. The Saturday Evening Post had been surpassed by Life magazine as the top mass market periodical in 1942 and then spiraled into a ten-year decline in advertising revenue after World War II. The Ladies' Home Journal lost its position to McCall's in 1960. Other experts said that the two flagship magazines "simply grew old." Curtis "fell into a formula that tended to attract older readers rather than the young married couples that advertisers wanted to reach." They also stayed away from the more aggressive circulation promotions used by their competitors. Matthew J. Culligan, President of Curtis, cited another financial drag from using its own presses and paper. Culligan said, "This sort of self-sufficiency is fine in good times but it imposes an intolerable burden when business goes bad." They had also failed to follow the model of some of their competitors by diversifying into television, news magazines or book publishing after World War II.

Meanwhile the company made editorial and executive changes at their magazine properties. Ben Hibbs, the editor of The Saturday Evening Post since 1942, retired, as did Bruce and Beatrice Gould of the Ladies' Home Journal (editors since 1935). The Post attempted to reinvent itself with more controversial articles and flashy graphics. Two editors--Robert Fouss (Saturday Evening Post) and Curtiss Anderson (Ladies' Home Journal) quickly came and went. Ted Patrick, editor of Holiday magazine, said that aggressive cost-cutting would be the kiss of death to Holiday.

Curtis received another loan of $5.5 million in 1964 to be used to make investments in new editorial properties.

Perfect Film loaned the company $5 million in 1968 at the request of Curtis's primary loan holder, First National Bank of Boston, to extend its loans.  Curtis sold its Philadelphia headquarters to real estate developer John W. Merriam for $7.3 million to pay off most of the First National loan; it leased half of the building back for its operations. In 1968, Curtis Publishing sold the Ladies' Home Journal and The American Home to Downe Communications for $5.4 million in stock; it sold the stock for operating revenue. The list of six million Post subscribers was sold to Life for cash, a $2.5 million loan, and a contract with Curtis' circulation and printing services subsidiaries. Despite these attempts to revive the Saturday Evening Post, and failing to find a purchaser for the magazine, Curtis Publishing shut it down in 1969. In March 1969, the Federal Trade Commission directed Curtis to offer cash refunds for unfulfilled portions of Post subscriptions.

Perfect Film purchased Curtis Circulation Company that same year.  In 1976, The Saturday Evening Post Society was spun off from Curtis to resume publication of its flagship magazine. U.S. Kids was formed, which publishes their portfolio of children's magazines.

21st century 
Curtis Publishing of the 21st century is a firm that licenses magazine covers and artwork from their archive of 4,000 images from over 500 artists. As Curtis Licensing, they provide images for advertising as well as to companies creating and selling memorabilia. The Norman Rockwell cover paintings and other images have been used for fine art and prints, greeting cards, figurines, and other collectibles.

Properties and subsidiaries 

The Saturday Evening Post
Ladies' Home Journal
The American Home
Holiday
Jack & Jill
The Country Gentleman
Novelty Press
National Analysts
Royal Electrotype Company

Curtis Center and Dream Garden

The offices and press building (as well as the company's warehouse) was designed by Edgar Viguers Seeler (1867-1929) in the Beaux Arts style. The square-block building stretches from South Sixth to South Seventh Street east to west, and from Sansom Street to Walnut Street north to south. The building was renovated in 1990 by Oldham and Seltz and John Milner Associates.

The interior of the building features a terraced waterfall and fountain, an atrium with faux-Egyptian palm trees, and the  glass-mosaic Dream Garden (1916) designed by Maxfield Parrish and made by Louis Tiffany and Tiffany Studios.  The glass-mosaic work was commissioned by Edward Bok, who was the Senior Editor of the company at the time. It was exhibited at Tiffany Studios in New York City for a month before being installed in the building's lobby, which took six months. The mosaic is made of 100,000 pieces of hand-fixed Favrile glass in 260 different colors.

In 1998, the mosaic was sold to casino owner Steve Wynn, who intended to move it to one of his casinos in Las Vegas.  This was blocked by local historians and art lovers, who raised $3.5 million to purchase the work and prevent its being moved from the city.  The money was provided by the Pew Charitable Trusts to the Pennsylvania Academy of the Fine Arts, which now owns the work.

See also

 Curtis Hall Arboretum, Curtis family estate in Wyncote, Pennsylvania

References
Notes

External links

 Finding aid to the Curtis Publishing Company records at the University of Pennsylvania Libraries
 Curtis Publishing Company website
 Listing and photographs at the Historic American Buildings Survey
 The Curtis Publishing Company Records, including financial records, advertising standards, magazines and newspaper clippings, are available for research use at the Historical Society of Pennsylvania.
 http://www.ushistory.org/districts/washingtonsquare/curti.htm
 Flickr photos of the Curtis Building
 Old postcards of the Curtis Building
 Curtis Institute of Music website
 The Frederic W. Goudy Collection at the Library of Congress contains illustrative advertising posters for the Curtis Publishing Company.
 FBI file on the Curtis Publishing Company

1891 establishments in Pennsylvania
American companies established in 1891
Companies based in Philadelphia
Landmarks in Philadelphia
Publishing companies established in 1891
Philadelphia Register of Historic Places
Washington Square West, Philadelphia